Lower Madawaska River Provincial Park is a waterway-class provincial park on the Madawaska River in Renfrew County, Ontario, Canada. The park includes the shores on both sides of the Madawaska River from Latchford Bridge to Griffith.

A non-operating park, it offers neither facilities nor services. Its most popular use is for whitewater kayaking and canoeing.

See also
 Upper Madawaska River Provincial Park - non-contiguous park that protects the upstream/northern portion of the same river.
List of Ontario parks

References

External links

Parks in Renfrew County
Provincial parks of Ontario
Protected areas established in 1989
1989 establishments in Ontario